Errol Freeman Brathwaite  (3 April 1924 – 4 December 2005) was a New Zealand author.

Biography
Born in Waipukurau in 1924, Brathwaite was educated at Timaru Boys' High School. He served in the Royal New Zealand Air Force as an air gunner in the Pacific in the latter part of World War II. He married Alison Whyte at St John's Church, Latimer Square, in Christchurch on 20 March 1948 and after a period in the army he began working in advertising.

In 1959, Brathwaite wrote his first book, Fear in the Night, a novel set in the Pacific during the Second World War, in which a New Zealand air crew try to repair their bomber and get it airborne again before an approaching Japanese patrol arrives. He became a full-time writer. The three novels The Flying Fish, The Needle's Eye and The Evil Day, written between 1964 and 1967, are a trilogy set during the New Zealand Wars of the nineteenth century. He wrote over 30 books, including many travel guides to New Zealand, and numerous radio plays.

In the 2001 New Year Honours, Brathwaite was appointed a Member of the New Zealand Order of Merit, for services to literature.

Brathwaite died in Christchurch in 2005 and was buried in Avonhead Cemetery.

Books

Fear in the Night 1959
An Affair of Men 1961
Long Way Home 1964
The Flying Fish 1964
The Needle's Eye 1965
The Evil Day 1967
Morning Flight 1970
The Companion Guide to the North Island of New Zealand 1970
The Companion Guide to the South Island of New Zealand 1972
The Beauty of New Zealand 1974
New Zealand and Its People 1974
Except the Lord Build the House 1977
The Flame Box 1978
Historic New Zealand 1980
Sixty Red Nightcaps and Other Curiosities of New Zealand History 1980
Wild New Zealand 1981
The Companion Guide to Westland 1981
Dunedin Photography 1981
The Beauty of Waikato-Bay of Plenty: Incorporating Rotorua & Taupo 1981
The Companion Guide to Otago, Southland and Stewart Island 1982
The Beauty of New Zealand's South Island 1982
The Beauty of New Zealand's North Island 1982
Pilot on the Run: The Epic Escape from Occupied France of Flight Sergeant L.S.M. (Chalky) White RNZAF 1986
Christchurch, North and Mid Canterbury 1988
A Portrait of New Zealand 1988
South Canterbury: Timaru, Mt Cook & the Mackenzie Country 1989
We'll Be Home for Christmas: The Second World War as Seen Through the Eyes of Ordinary New Zealanders Who Served in the Royal New Zealand Air Force (edited) 1994

References

1924 births
2005 deaths
New Zealand male novelists
People from Waipukurau
New Zealand military personnel of World War II
20th-century New Zealand novelists
Members of the New Zealand Order of Merit
People educated at Timaru Boys' High School
Burials at Avonhead Cemetery
20th-century New Zealand male writers